Tiberian may refer to:

 Tiberian vocalization, an oral tradition within the Hebrew language
 Tiberian Hebrew, the variety of Hebrew based on Tiberian vocalization
 Tiberias, a city in Lower Galilee, Israel
 Tiberius, relating to the reign of the Roman emperor
 Command & Conquer: Tiberian series, several titles in a series of computer games